Portland towers are two former Aalborg Portland silos which have been converted into a BREEAM-certified office building in the emerging Nordhavn district of Copenhagen, Denmark. The conversion was completed in 2014 to design by Design Group Architects.

History
Sandkaj (Sand Quay) was built in connection with an extension to the Freeport of Copenhagen in the 1950s and 1960s. The silos were built in 1979 by Aalborg Portland for the storage of cement. They were converted into an office building by NCC Property Development in 2013–14 with ATP Ejendomme, PFA Pension and Pensiondanmark as investors. The project was designed by Design Group Architects.

Design
The seven floors were constructed on the exterior of the two silos. The interior of the silos contain reception, stairs and elevators. The lowest of the seven floors is located 24 metres above the ground. The design resembles that of Gemini Residences at the Islands Brygge waterfront.

Tenants and facilities
The individual tenancies vary in size from 500–1,500 square metres. On the top floor is a canteen and a rooftop terrace.

The first tenant in the building was Dansk Standard. They have later been joined by PA Consulting, the corporate finance consultant FIH Partners samt and the law firm Brockstedt-Kaalund. Since February 2018 the building is also home to the German embassy in Copenhagen.

References

External links

Nordhavn, Copenhagen
Industrial buildings in Østerbro
Office buildings in Copenhagen
Industrial buildings completed in 1979
Office buildings completed in 2014